Gem is an unincorporated community in Noble County, in the U.S. state of Ohio.

History
Gem was founded in 1892 by Thomas R. Harper, who built a store there and became the community's first postmaster. A post office was established at Gem in 1895, and remained in operation until 1904.

References

Unincorporated communities in Noble County, Ohio
Unincorporated communities in Ohio